Xylodromus sassuchini is a species of rove beetle in the Omaliinae subfamily that is endemic to Russia.

References 

Beetles described in 1936
Omaliinae
Endemic fauna of Russia